Paul Lawrence Andrea (born July 31, 1941) is a Canadian former ice hockey right winger.  He played in the National Hockey League for the New York Rangers, Pittsburgh Penguins, California Golden Seals, and Buffalo Sabres.  He also played in the World Hockey Association for the Cleveland Crusaders.

In his NHL career, Andrea played in 150 games, scoring 31 goals and adding 49 assists.  He played in 135 WHA games, scoring 36 goals and adding 48 assists.

Born in North Sydney, Nova Scotia, Andrea currently lives in Sydney, Nova Scotia

Career statistics

Regular season and playoffs

External links

1941 births
Living people
Amarillo Wranglers players
Buffalo Sabres players
California Golden Seals players
Canadian expatriate ice hockey players in the United States
Canadian ice hockey right wingers
Cincinnati Swords players
Cleveland Crusaders players
Guelph Biltmore Mad Hatters players
Guelph Royals players
Ice hockey people from Nova Scotia
Jacksonville Barons players
Minnesota Rangers players
New York Rangers players
People from North Sydney, Nova Scotia
Pittsburgh Penguins players
Sportspeople from the Cape Breton Regional Municipality
St. Paul Rangers players
Tulsa Oilers (1964–1984) players
Vancouver Canucks (WHL) players